Make Him Do Right is the third album by the American singer Karyn White, released in 1994. Its first single was "Hungah".

Critical reception

The Knoxville News Sentinel deemed the album "a lifeless recording overloaded with braindead ballads." The Philadelphia Inquirer wrote that the album "forces [White] more into New Jill Swing-dom, rather than adult contemporary rhythm and blues."

Track listing

Production
Executive producers: Jimmy Jam, Terry Lewis, Benny Medina, Karyn White
Producers: Babyface, McKinley Horton, Jimmy Jam, Terry Lewis, Jellybean Johnson, Daryl Simmons, Karyn White
Drum programming: Babyface, Jeff Taylor, Daryl Simmons
Mastering: Tom Baker
Engineer: David Betancourt, Eric Fischer, Brad Gilderman, Steve Hodge, Thom "TK" Kidd, Jeff Taylor, Willie Williams
Assistant engineer: David Betancourt, Eric Fischer, Alex Lowe, Jason Shablik, Jeff Taylor, Will Williams
Mixing: Steve Hodge, Mick Guzauski
Production coordination: Ivy Skoff

Personnel
Keyboards: Lance Alexander, Babyface, McKinley Horton, Lisa Keith, Daryl Simmons, Jimmy Wright
Guest artist: Babyface, Jimmy Jam, Lisa Keith, Terry Lewis
Background vocals: Babyface, Lisa Bass, Valerie Davis, Carrie Harrington, Lisa Keith, Prof. T., Tanya Smith, Billy Steele, Libby Turner, Karyn White, Jimmy Wright
Arranger: McKinley Horton, Jimmy Jam, Jellybean Johnson, Terry Lewis, Karyn White
String arrangements: Lee Blaske
Multi instruments: Jimmy Jam, Terry Lewis
Viola: Evelina Chao
Violin: Carolyn Daws, Hanley Daws, Helen Foli, John Kennedy, Tom Kornacker, Melinda Marshall, Michal Sobieski, Daria Tedeschi
Bass: Nathan East, Ronnie Garrett, Mark Haynes
Cello: Sarah Lewis, Laura Sewell, Daryl Skobba
Guitar: Jellybean Johnson, Kevin Pierce, Michael Scott
Harp: Andrea Stern
Acoustic guitar: Mike Scott
Clarinet: Ken Holmen
Flute: Ken Holmen
Drums: Daryl Simmons, Stokley Williams
Percussion: Stokley Williams

Charts

Weekly charts

Year-end charts

References

1994 albums
Karyn White albums
Albums produced by Jimmy Jam and Terry Lewis